Sherwood is a city in Renville County, North Dakota, United States. The population was 194 as of the 2020 census. It is part of the Minot Micropolitan Statistical Area. It was founded in 1904 and named after Sherwood H. Sleeper, a Mohall banker who had owned land in the area.

Sherwood's weather station has one of the lowest (if not the lowest) yearly precipitation levels in North Dakota, with an annual normal of 13.13 inches (1971–2000).

Sherwood is designated by the U.S. Customs and Border Protection agency as a port of entry between the United States and Canada.

Geography
Sherwood is located at  (48.961469, -101.631889).

Demographics

2010 census
As of the census of 2010, there were 242 people, 110 households, and 70 families residing in the city. The racial makeup of the city was 99.2% White and 0.8% from two or more races. Hispanic or Latino of any race were 0.4% of the population.

There were 110 households, of which 31.8% had children under the age of 18 living with them, 51.8% were married couples living together, 4.5% had a female householder with no husband present, 7.3% had a male householder with no wife present, and 36.4% were non-families. 34.5% of all households were made up of individuals, and 16.4% had someone living alone who was 65 years of age or older. The average household size was 2.20 and the average family size was 2.74.

The median age in the city was 42.3 years. 26% of residents were under the age of 18; 2.5% were between the ages of 18 and 24; 25.2% were from 25 to 44; 25.3% were from 45 to 64; and 21.1% were 65 years of age or older. The gender makeup of the city was 49.6% male and 50.4% female.

2000 census
As of the census of 2000, there were 255 people, 117 households, and 65 families residing in the city. The population density was 802.2 people per square mile (307.7/km). There were 138 housing units at an average density of 434.1 per square mile (166.5/km). The racial makeup of the city was 98.04% White, 1.18% Native American, and 0.78% from two or more races.

There were 117 households, out of which 28.2% had children under the age of 18 living with them, 47.0% were married couples living together, 5.1% had a female householder with no husband present, and 43.6% were non-families. 42.7% of all households were made up of individuals, and 24.8% had someone living alone who was 65 years of age or older. The average household size was 2.18 and the average family size was 3.08.

In the city, the population was spread out, with 27.5% under the age of 18, 4.7% from 18 to 24, 25.1% from 25 to 44, 23.1% from 45 to 64, and 19.6% who were 65 years of age or older. The median age was 41 years. For every 100 females, there were 96.2 males. For every 100 females age 18 and over, there were 96.8 males.

The median income for a household in the city was $26,442, and the median income for a family was $34,167. Males had a median income of $27,500 versus $25,625 for females. The per capita income for the city was $14,756. None of the families and 7.3% of the population were living below the poverty line, including no under eighteens and 15.7% of those over 64.

Education
Sherwood is served by the Mohall Lansford Sherwood School District.  Sherwood Elementary School educates children in grades K–6.  Sherwood High School closed its doors in 2005. The nickname for the school was the Wildcats. In 2016, the elementary school closed, and now all students go to school in Mohall.

History

The town site of Sherwood was homesteaded by Bert C. Loomis.  Loomis deeded to the land to Sherwood H. Sleeper, who subsequently deeded the land to the Northern Town and Land Company or Corporation, who surveyed it into lots.

A site for a town was purchased by Sherwood H. Sleeper in the summer of 1904 on the NE quarter of Section 12, Range 85, Township 163.  On August 4, 1904, the surveying and platting was begun and the town site plat was filed in Imperial Ward County on September 6, 1904. The town was named Sherwood.

The earliest post office of Colquhoun was located on the west side of the township, five miles from the present site of Sherwood, on what was the Maurice Walsh farm.  This was known as the “Nina” Post Office.  The late C. A. Verry of Minot was instrumental in getting the “Nina” Post Office located in Calquhoun.  The postmaster at the Nina Post Office was O. H. Moon.  There was also a post office in Eden Valley township called the “Bolacker” Post Office.  Mrs. Alexander was the postmistress there.  Later, both the Nina and Bolacker Post Offices were moved to the present site of Sherwood with Mrs. Alexander as postmistress.

Rural free delivery was established in the fall of 1904 with Fred Cool, Charlie King and Henry Hurdelbrink as mail carriers.

Sherwood was organized as a village in April 1905.  The first village officers were: C.H. Ennis, Chairman; F.L. Denneson, Trustee; K.T. Roble, Trustee; W.H. Walker, Trustee; H.W. Conway, Marshal; E.O. Keene, Justice; J.G. Connole, Treasurer; and R.L. Young, Clerk.

Education history

Brother Charles Gauber started a small school called the Simon Olson Shack before the town was incorporated.  The town grade school opened under Miss Lelah Conkey and Lily Traux.  Members of the board were: N. Nelson, President; P.A. Conkey; Simon Olson; and T.R. McFarlane, Clerk.  In 1908 a high school was added and in 1912, five teachers were employed.

In 1916, a separate high school building east of the grade school was built.  The first graduation class from the high school were: Esther Stenzel, Cora Knutson, Paul Goheen, and Glenn Sansburn.  The Beckedahl School was moved in and used as a classroom in 1922.  Children were brought in by buses.  All recreation, even basketball, was outdoors.

Modern history
In 2015, after failing to turn Leith into an all white community, Craig Cobb moved to Sherwood. Craig has expressed a desire to turn the town into a white nationalist community.

Notes

External links
 

Cities in Renville County, North Dakota
Cities in North Dakota
Populated places established in 1904
1904 establishments in North Dakota
Minot, North Dakota micropolitan area